This is a list of holidays in the Democratic Republic of the Congo

Public holidays

References 

Congo (Dem)
Democratic Republic of the Congo culture
Holidays
Democratic Republic of the Congo